East Main Street Commercial Historic District is a national historic district located at Palmyra in Wayne County, New York, USA. The district encompasses Palmyra's downtown business area and contains two blocks of solid, brick 19th century commercial architecture. These almost unbroken commercial facades are two and three stories high with a variety of cornice detail and first floor treatment. Included are a number of cast iron storefronts.

It was listed on the National Register of Historic Places in 1974.  In 2009, it was included in the Palmyra Village Historic District.

References

Commercial buildings on the National Register of Historic Places in New York (state)
Historic districts on the National Register of Historic Places in New York (state)
Historic districts in Wayne County, New York
National Register of Historic Places in Wayne County, New York